The Rural Municipality of Gull Lake No. 139 is a rural municipality (RM) in the Canadian province of Saskatchewan within Census Division No. 8 and  Division No. 3. It is located in the southwest portion of the province.

History 
The RM of Gull Lake No. 139 incorporated as a rural municipality on January 1, 1913.

Demographics 

Geography

Communities and localities 
The following urban municipalities are surrounded by the RM.

Towns
 Gull Lake

Villages
 Tompkins

Government 
The RM of Gull Lake No. 139 is governed by an elected municipal council and an appointed administrator that meets on the second Tuesday of every month. The reeve of the RM is Elizabeth Kramer while its administrator is Jeanette Kerr. The RM's office is located in Gull Lake.

Transportation 
 Saskatchewan Highway 1
 Saskatchewan Highway 37
 Saskatchewan Highway 631
 Canadian Pacific Railway

See also 
List of rural municipalities in Saskatchewan

References 

G